Danilo das Neves Pinheiro (born 30 August 1992), known by his nickname Tchê Tchê, is a Brazilian professional footballer who plays for Botafogo. Although usually employed as a central midfielder, he is an extremely versatile player who can play in multiple roles such as a right or left back, defensive midfielder or even as a winger.

Club career
Born in São Paulo, Tchê Tchê joined Audax's youth setup in 2006, after being approved on a trial. He made his senior debut for the club on 27 March 2011, playing the last 14 minutes in a 3–1 Campeonato Paulista Série A2 home win against Rio Branco.

Tchê Tchê was a regular starter for Audax in the club's first season in Campeonato Paulista, appearing in ten matches. His first match in the tournament occurred on 18 January 2014, a 0–0 away draw against Paulista.

After subsequent loans at Guaratinguetá, Ponte Preta and Boa Esporte, Tchê Tchê impressed with Audax during the 2016 Paulistão; he scored his first professional goal on 23 April 2016, netting from long range in a 2–2 draw at Corinthians, which ensured his team's qualification to the finals for the first time in their history.

On 28 April 2016, Tchê Tchê signed a pre-contract with Série A club Palmeiras, being effective after the Campeonato Paulista finals.

On 8 June 2018 he signed 5-year contract with Ukrainian Premier League club Dynamo Kyiv.

On 30 March 2019, Tchê Tchê signed a four-year contract with São Paulo, coming back for his country Brazil.

On 6 April 2021, Tchê Tchê joined Atlético Mineiro on loan with an option to buy until May 2022.

Career statistics

Club

Honours

Club
Palmeiras
Campeonato Brasileiro Série A: 2016

Dynamo Kyiv
Ukrainian Super Cup: 2018

Atlético Mineiro
Campeonato Brasileiro Série A: 2021
Copa do Brasil: 2021
Campeonato Mineiro: 2021, 2022
Supercopa do Brasil: 2022

Individual
 Campeonato Paulista Team of the Year: 2016
 Campeonato Paulista Best Newcomer: 2016
 Bola de Prata: 2016
 Campeonato Brasileiro Série A Team of the Year: 2016

References

External links

 

1992 births
Living people
Footballers from São Paulo
Brazilian footballers
Brazilian expatriate footballers
Association football defenders
Association football midfielders
Association football utility players
Campeonato Brasileiro Série A players
Campeonato Brasileiro Série B players
Campeonato Brasileiro Série C players
Grêmio Osasco Audax Esporte Clube players
Guaratinguetá Futebol players
Associação Atlética Ponte Preta players
Boa Esporte Clube players
Sociedade Esportiva Palmeiras players
Ukrainian Premier League players
FC Dynamo Kyiv players
Expatriate footballers in Ukraine
Brazilian expatriate sportspeople in Ukraine
São Paulo FC players
Clube Atlético Mineiro players
Botafogo de Futebol e Regatas players